Eupithecia urbanata is a moth in the family Geometridae. It was described by David Stephen Fletcher in 1956. It is found in Djibouti and Ethiopia.

References

Moths described in 1956
urbanata
Fauna of Djibouti
Insects of Ethiopia
Moths of Africa